Blues musicians are musical artists who are primarily recognized as writing, performing, and recording blues music.  They come from different eras and include styles such as ragtime-vaudeville, Delta and country blues, and urban styles from Chicago and the West Coast.  In the last several decades, blues music has developed a less regional character and has been influenced by rhythm and blues, rock, and other popular music.

Pre-1940 blues

1940–1979 blues

Blues since 1980

See also
 List of nicknames of blues musicians
Lists of blues musicians by genre

References
Citations

Sources

 
Blues